George Charles Jacks (born 14 March 1946 in Stepney) is an English former professional footballer. His clubs included Queens Park Rangers,  Millwall and Gillingham, where he made over 150 Football League appearances. He joined near neighbours Gravesend & Northfleet in 1976 helping them to win the Southern League Cup in 1978. He was voted Player of the Year the following season. He joined Barking in 1981.

References

1946 births
Living people
English footballers
Gillingham F.C. players
Millwall F.C. players
Queens Park Rangers F.C. players
Ebbsfleet United F.C. players
Barking F.C. players
Footballers from Stepney
Association football midfielders